"He Ain't You" is a song written by Jeff Barry, Brad Burg, Lisa Hartman and Dene Hofheinz. It was recorded by American country music artist Lynn Anderson and released as a single in August 1977 via Columbia Records.

Background and release
"He Ain't You" was recorded at the Columbia Studio in April 1977, located in Nashville, Tennessee. The sessions was produced by Glenn Sutton, Anderson's longtime production collaborator at the label and her first husband. It also was produced by Steve Gibson, who would work with Anderson on future releases.

"He Ain't You" became a major hit when it reached number 19 on the Billboard Hot Country Singles chart in 1977. It also became a major hit on the Canadian RPM Country Songs chart, reaching number 15 the same year. The song was issued on Anderson's 1977 studio album of the I Love What Love Is Doing to Me/He Ain't You.

Track listings 
7" vinyl single
 "He Ain't You" – 3:06
 "It's Your Love That Keeps Me Going" – 2:34

Chart performance

References

1977 singles
1977 songs
Columbia Records singles
Lynn Anderson songs
Songs written by Jeff Barry
Song recordings produced by Glenn Sutton